Bhadreshkumar Chetanbhai Patel (born May 15, 1990) is an Indian fugitive wanted for allegedly killing his wife Palak Patel at a Dunkin' Donuts store in Hanover, Maryland, in the United States on April 12, 2015. He was added to the FBI Ten Most Wanted Fugitives list on April 18, 2017. Patel was the 514th fugitive to be placed on the FBI's Ten Most Wanted Fugitives list. He was last seen at Newark Penn Station near his hotel in Newark, New Jersey.

Background
Patel was born on May 15, 1990, in Viramgam, Gujarat, India. By 2015, he was married to Palak Patel, and the couple were traveling together to visit relatives in the United States. Patel was 24 at the time while Palak was 21.

Murder
On the night of April 12, 2015, Patel and Palak were working a night shift at a Dunkin' Donuts in Hanover, Maryland. The store was owned by a relative of Patel whom the couple were visiting. Surveillance footage showed Palak and Patel walking together in the kitchen at around 9:30 p.m. before disappearing out of view behind some racks. Moments later, Patel re-emerged without his wife, turned off an oven, and left the store.

The body of 21-year-old Palak Patel was found later that night. She had been beaten to death and stabbed multiple times with a large kitchen knife. Investigators believe the couple had an argument, with Palak wanting to return to India and Patel wishing to remain in the U.S. instead.

Aftermath
Customers arriving at the Dunkin' Donuts store grew concerned when no employees came to serve them. A police officer who happened to be near the store was approached by concerned customers and checked out the scene. Upon searching the store the officer found Palak's body. Police then checked the surveillance video and realized the killer was Patel, who had vanished. Patel was not identified as the suspect until over an hour after the murder, giving him time to escape.

After murdering Palak, Patel fled the store and returned to his nearby apartment on foot. He took some personal items and then got a cab to a hotel near an airport in Newark, New Jersey. The taxi driver reported that Patel was very calm during the journey. He checked into a hotel in Newark and was seen on surveillance video at the counter paying in cash for a room. He checked out the following morning.

Patel was last seen on the morning of April 13, 2015, around 10 a.m. at Newark Penn Station in New Jersey. He took a hotel shuttle to the station and has not been seen since.

Investigation
Authorities believe Patel could have fled the country or could be hiding with relatives. Patel had a visa to be in the U.S., but it had expired by the time he carried out the murder. A report stated that because of this, there was no indication he was able to legally leave the country.

An investigation with Palak's family into the murder revealed that the last conversation she had with them was about wishing to return home to India. This call was made moments before Palak was murdered by her husband and had been overheard by him. Police believe that Patel murdered his wife for this reason.

Patel has connections in Canada, India, New Jersey, Kentucky, Georgia, and Illinois. A reward of up to $100,000 is available for information that leads to his whereabouts.

See also
 List of fugitives from justice who disappeared

References

External links
FBI profile
Wanted by the FBI: Top Ten Fugitive Bhadreshkumar Chetanbhai Patel - Youtube

 

1990 births
2015 murders in the United States
FBI Ten Most Wanted Fugitives
Fugitives wanted by the United States
Fugitives wanted on murder charges